Prospekt Mira may refer to:
Mira Avenue, a street in Moscow
Prospekt Mira (Koltsevaya line), a Moscow Metro station on the Koltsevaya line
Prospekt Mira (Kaluzhsko-Rizhskaya line), a Moscow Metro station on the Kaluzhsko-Rizhskaya line